Yasmine Laurel Alizée Yamajako is a Finnish singer. She has studied at the Helsinki Pop & Jazz Conservatory. In 2008, Yamajako played the role of Gabriella in the Helsinki City Theatre adaptation of High School Musical on Stage!. Yamajako appeared as a featured singer in a song Syypää sun hymyyn by a Finnish rapper Cheek. Yamajako's mother is Finnish. From her father's side, she has Beninese roots. Yamajako's aunt is the singer Laura Voutilainen.

Dubbing 
 Camp Rock - Ella
 Monster High - Additional voices
 Camp Rock 2: The Final Jam - Ella
 Barbie: Princess Charm School - Portia
 Barbie: A Perfect Christmas - Skipper
 Mia and Me - Mia
 Barbie: Life in the Dreamhouse - Skipper, Raquelle, Additional voices
 My Little Pony: Friendship is Magic - Trixie, Cherilee, Additional voices
 Barbie: The Princess and the Popstar - Keira
 Hotel Transylvania - Mavis Dracula
 Ever After High - Cedar Wood
 Sheriff Callie's Wild West - Toby
 Moana/Vaiana - Moana/Vaiana

References

Living people
Finnish women musicians
Finnish people of French descent
Finnish people of Beninese descent
Year of birth missing (living people)